Christof Lauer (born 25 May 1953) is a German jazz tenor and soprano saxophonist, born in Melsungen, Germany, perhaps most well known in Europe where he has done projects with various musicians, such as Palle Danielsson, Carla Bley, Anthony Cox, Michel Godard and Gary Husband, Vince Mendoza's Jazzpaña, Michel Portal, Maria João, Alphonse Mouzon, and Peter Erskine.

Since 1979 he is member of the Jazzensemble des Hessischen Rundfunks led by  Albert Mangelsdorff. In 1994 Lauer joined the United Jazz and Rock Ensemble and replaced Charlie Mariano, and is also a member of the Hamburg NDR Radio Orchestra.

Discography
 Perlboot (L+R Records, 1987), quartet with Ralf R. Hübner
 Christof Lauer (CMP, 1989), quartet with Joachim Kühn, Palle Danielsson and Peter Erskine
 Moabiter Blues (L+R Records, 1991), duo with Ralf R. Hübner
 Bluebells (CMP, 1992) with Wolfgang Puschnig, Bob Stewart and Thomas Alkier
 Evidence (CMP, 1995), trio featuring Anthony Cox and Daniel Humair
 Mondspinner (Free Flow Music, 1996), quartet with Ralf R. Hübner
 Fragile Network (ACT, 1999), quintet featuring Michel Godard, Marc Ducret, Anthony Cox and Gene Jackson
 Shadows in the Rain (ACT, 2001), duo with pianist Jens Thomas plus strings featuring Sidsel Endresen, tribute to Sting
 Pure Joy (ACT, 2003), duo with pianist Jens Thomas
 Heaven (ACT, 2003) with Norwegian Brass featuring Sondre Bratland, Rebekka Bakken and Geir Lysne
 Blues in Mind (ACT, 2007) with Michel Godard and Gary Husband
 Play Sidney Bechet Petite Fleur (ACT, 2014) with the NDR BigBand

References

German jazz saxophonists
Male saxophonists
German male musicians
1953 births
Living people
United Jazz + Rock Ensemble members
Hoch Conservatory alumni
20th-century saxophonists
21st-century saxophonists
20th-century German male musicians
21st-century German male musicians
German male jazz musicians
ACT Music artists